The 2008–09 Danish 1st Division season is the 13th season of the Danish 1st Division league championship, governed by the Danish Football Association.

The division-champion and runner-up will be promoted to the 2009–10 Danish Superliga. The teams in the 14th, 15th and 16th places will be divided between 2nd Division East and West, based on location.

On February 3, Køge Boldklub declared bankruptcy. As a result, they were docked three points and were suspended from the tournament. Furthermore, they will be relegated two levels in addition to the one they have clinched at the moment, making them participate in Sjællandsserien from the 2009–10 season.

On February 14, however, it was announced that First Division clubs Køge Boldklub and Herfølge Boldklub intended to merge their first teams to form HB Køge, and on March 14, the club was approved by the Danish FA.

Participants

League table

Results

Top goalscorers
Last updated: 12 June 2009; Source: Danish Football Association

Managerial changes

References

External links
  1. division 2008–09 at Haslund.info

Danish 1st Division seasons
Denmark
2008–09 in Danish football